Blane is a surname. Notable people with the name include:

People
Archibald Blane (c. 1787–1852), British businessman
Alexander Blane (c. 1850–1917), Irish politician
Frances Aviva Blane, English painter
G. R. Blane (1791–1821), employee of the East India Company in British India
Gilbert Blane (1749–1834), Scottish physician who pioneered the use of limejuice in the Royal Navy as a preventative for scurvy
Helen Blane (1913–2000), British alpine skier.
John Blane (1929–2012), American diplomat
Marcie Blane (born 1944), American pop singer
Mark Blane (born 1988), American actor, writer, and director
Nicholas Blane, English actor
Ralph Blane (1914–1995), American composer, lyricist, and performer
Sally Blane (1910–1997), American actress
Steven Blane, American rabbi
Sue Blane (born 1949), English costume designer
Thomas Blane, (fl. 1918–1922), English politician
William Blane (1750–1835), British landowner and F.R.S.

Fictional characters
Jonas Blane, character in American TV show The Unit
Torchy Blane, female reporter in Warner Bros. films

See also
Blane (given name)
Blain (surname)
Blaine (surname)